Cambremer is a commune in the Calvados department in the Normandy region in northwestern France. Cambremer is located in the heart of the Pays d'Auge, between Lisieux and Caen.
The village is twinned with Witheridge, UK, and the two villages have annual exchange trips (although not solely for students).

Etymology
The exact etymology of the name of the town is unknown. The village is mentioned, however, from the seventh century under the Latinized form of Cambrimaro.

The second element is probably the Germanic meaning lake or pond (see Old English meri: lake, pond, now in place names -Mère). Common in the north of France (see Mortemer).

History
In 1973, the former communes of Grandouet, Saint-Aubin-sur-Algot and Saint-Pair-du-Mont were incorporated in Cambremer. On 1 January 2019, the former commune of Saint-Laurent-du-Mont was merged into Cambremer.

Heraldry
The arms of the town of Cambremer are: Gules the two-headed eagle displayed gold.

Population

See also
Communes of the Calvados department

References

Communes of Calvados (department)
Calvados communes articles needing translation from French Wikipedia